LLiNK  is a former Dutch broadcasting association which produced radio and television programmes for the Netherlands Public Broadcasting system, NPO. Its self-proclaimed aim is the making of positive and solution-focused programmes dealing with global relationships, human and animal rights, nature and the environment in a spirit of practical idealism.

It was announced in November 2009 that NPO would cease carrying programming produced by LLiNK by the end of 2010 owing to "administration, finances and membership problems". LLiNK appealed against the decision with an online viewer petition to keep the channel on air, and when the association ceased broadcasting on NPO in September 2010, its operators continued to maintain a request for renewed access to the public broadcasting system. The Amsterdam court decided on 29 April 2011 that LLiNK could not return to the public broadcasting system. In 2015, the website of LLiNK was no longer accessible, showing only a message that "LLiNK is currently off air".

Television programmes
 3 op Reis (presented by Floortje Dessing; now produced by BNN)
 Aanpakken en wegwezen
 De Milieuridders
 LLiNK Docu's
 LLinke Soep
 LLiNK Warzone
 Mc Donald's Kitchen
 Mr. Kahoona Positive Happiness Show
 MoveYourAss

Radio programmes
LLiNK radio programmes included:
 Desmet Live, Mondays and Wednesdays at 18.00–19.50 on Radio 5, presented by Pieter Hilhorst (Mondays) and Francisco van Jole and Dieuwertje Blok (Wednesdays)
 De Geitenwollensokkenshow, Sundays at 20.00–21.00 on Radio 1, presented by Francisco van Jole
 LLinke Soep, Fridays at 20.00–21.00 on Radio 1, presented by Marcel van der Steen
 MoveYourAss, Tuesdays at 22.00–1.00 on 3FM, presented by Rudy Mackay

Presenters
As well as those mentioned above, other presenters included:
Edo Brunner 
Froukje Jansen

External links
Official website (in Dutch)

References

Dutch public broadcasting organisations
Netherlands Public Broadcasting
Dutch-language television networks